The 1982–83 Philadelphia 76ers season was the 37th season of the franchise (going back to their days as the Syracuse Nationals) and their 20th season in Philadelphia. The 76ers entered the season as runner-ups in the 1982 NBA Finals, where they lost to the Los Angeles Lakers in six games.

Harold Katz bought the franchise in 1982. On his watch, the final piece of the championship puzzle was completed before the 1982–83 season when they acquired free-agent center Moses Malone from the Houston Rockets in a sign-and-trade for Caldwell Jones, joining an already stacked roster led by Hall of Famers Julius Erving, Maurice Cheeks and Bobby Jones, as well as All-Star Andrew Toney. They went on to dominate the regular season,ending the year with a 65-17 record in what is still their second highest winning season in franchise history.

Erving was the team captain and was named the NBA All Star Game MVP, while Malone was named the league's MVP. When reporters asked how the playoffs would run, he answered, "four, four, four", predicting that the Sixers would need to only play four games in each of the three playoff series to win the title. Malone spoke in a non-rhotic accent, pronouncing the boast as "fo', fo', fo'."

The Sixers backed up Malone's boast, breezing through the Eastern Conference playoffs, sweeping the New York Knicks in the Semifinals, then beating the Milwaukee Bucks in five games in the Conference Finals. They went on to win their third NBA championship with a four-game sweep of the defending NBA champion Los Angeles Lakers, who had defeated them the season before. Malone was named the Finals MVP, and his prediction turned out to be only one game off, as some used the adapted phrase "fo', fi', fo'" reflecting their one playoff loss to the Bucks.

Regarded as one of the greatest teams in history, their 12–1 playoff record  ranks as the third-best in league history after the 2016–17 Warriors, who went 16–1, and the 2000–01 Lakers, who went 15–1 en route to the NBA title coincidentally beating the 76ers in the finals.  The Philadelphia-based group Pieces of a Dream had a minor hit in 1983 with the R&B song "Fo-Fi-Fo", which title was prompted by Malone's quip.

Draft picks

Roster

Regular season

Season standings

Record vs. opponents

Game log

|- align="center" bgcolor="bbffbb"
| 1 || October 29 || @ New York Knicks || 104–89 || Madison Square Garden || 1–0
|- align="center" bgcolor="bbffbb"
| 2 || October 30 || New Jersey Nets || 110–99 || Philadelphia Spectrum || 2–0
|-

|- align="center" bgcolor="bbffbb"
| 3 || November 3 || San Diego Clippers || 130–111 || Philadelphia Spectrum || 3–0
|- align="center" bgcolor="bbffbb"
| 4 || November 5 || @ Detroit Pistons || 120–109 || Pontiac Silverdome || 4–0
|- align="center" bgcolor="bbffbb"
| 5 || November 6 || Boston Celtics || 119–115 || Philadelphia Spectrum || 5–0
|- align="center" bgcolor="bbffbb"
| 6 || November 10 || Chicago Bulls || 145–108 || Philadelphia Spectrum || 6–0
|- align="center" bgcolor="edbebf"
| 7 || November 12 || Indiana Pacers || 108–117 || Philadelphia Spectrum || 6–1
|- align="center" bgcolor="bbffbb"
| 8 || November 13 || @ New Jersey Nets || 110–100 || Brendan Byrne Arena || 7–1
|- align="center" bgcolor="bbffbb"
| 9 || November 14 || Washington Bullets || 102–93 || Philadelphia Spectrum || 8–1
|- align="center" bgcolor="bbffbb"
| 10 || November 17 || Detroit Pistons || 120–103 || Philadelphia Spectrum || 9–1
|- align="center" bgcolor="bbffbb"
| 11 || November 19 || Milwaukee Bucks || 121–109 || Philadelphia Spectrum || 10–1
|- align="center" bgcolor="edbebf"
| 12 || November 23 || Portland Trail Blazers || 103–106 || Philadelphia Spectrum || 10–2
|- align="center" bgcolor="bbffbb"
| 13 || November 24 || @ Indiana Pacers || 121–106 || Market Square Arena || 11–2
|- align="center" bgcolor="bbffbb"
| 14 || November 26 || @ Cleveland Cavaliers || 120–102 || Coliseum at Richfield || 12–2
|- align="center" bgcolor="bbffbb"
| 15 || November 27 || Utah Jazz || 126–113 || Philadelphia Spectrum || 13–2
|- align="center" bgcolor="edbebf"
| 16 || November 30 || @ Atlanta Hawks || 97–111 || Omni Coliseum || 13–3
|-

|- align="center" bgcolor="bbffbb"
| 17 || December 2 || @ Phoenix Suns || 116–108 || Arizona Veterans Memorial Coliseum || 14–3
|- align="center" bgcolor="bbffbb"
| 18 || December 3 || @ San Diego Clippers || 127–110 || San Diego Sports Arena || 15–3
|- align="center" bgcolor="bbffbb"
| 19 || December 5 || @ Los Angeles Lakers || 114–104 || The Forum || 16–3
|- align="center" bgcolor="bbffbb"
| 20 || December 8 || Atlanta Hawks || 132–85 || Philadelphia Spectrum || 17–3
|- align="center" bgcolor="edbebf"
| 21 || December 10 || @ Boston Celtics  || 97–123 || Boston Garden || 17–4
|- align="center" bgcolor="bbffbb"
| 22 || December 11 || Detroit Pistons || 128–111 || Philadelphia Spectrum || 18–4
|- align="center" bgcolor="bbffbb"
| 23 || December 15 || Cleveland Cavaliers || 99–93 || Philadelphia Spectrum || 19–4
|- align="center" bgcolor="bbffbb"
| 24 || December 17 || New York Knicks || 109–95 || Philadelphia Spectrum || 20–4
|- align="center" bgcolor="edbebf"
| 25 || December 18 || @ Washington Bullets || 97–100 || Capital Centre || 20–5
|- align="center" bgcolor="bbffbb"
| 26 || December 21 || Boston Celtics || 122–105 || Philadelphia Spectrum || 21–5
|- align="center" bgcolor="bbffbb"
| 27 || December 26 || @ San Antonio Spurs || 124–122 || HemisFair Arena || 22–5
|- align="center" bgcolor="bbffbb"
| 28 || December 28 || @ Houston Rockets || 104–93 || The Summit || 23–5
|- align="center" bgcolor="bbffbb"
| 29 || December 29 || @ Dallas Mavericks || 126–116 || Reunion Arena || 24–5
|-

|- align="center" bgcolor="bbffbb"
| 30 || January 5 || Los Angeles Lakers || 122–120 || Philadelphia Spectrum || 25–5
|- align="center" bgcolor="bbffbb"
| 31 || January 7 || @ Washington Bullets || 106–89 || Capital Centre || 26–5
|- align="center" bgcolor="bbffbb"
| 32 || January 8 || Kansas City Kings || 125–113 || Philadelphia Spectrum || 27–5
|- align="center" bgcolor="bbffbb"
| 33 || January 11 || @ Atlanta Hawks || 109–99 || Omni Coliseum || 28–5
|- align="center" bgcolor="bbffbb"
| 34 || January 12 || Milwaukee Bucks || 122–121 || Philadelphia Spectrum || 29–5
|- align="center" bgcolor="bbffbb"
| 35 || January 14 || @ Detroit Pistons || 115–105 || Pontiac Silverdome || 30–5
|- align="center" bgcolor="bbffbb"
| 36 || January 15 || Indiana Pacers || 114–105 || Philadelphia Spectrum || 31–5
|- align="center" bgcolor="bbffbb"
| 37 || January 18 || @ Cleveland Cavaliers || 98–90 || Coliseum at Richfield || 32–5
|- align="center" bgcolor="bbffbb"
| 38 || January 19 || Chicago Bulls || 126–106 || Philadelphia Spectrum || 33–5
|- align="center" bgcolor="bbffbb"
| 39 || January 21 || Seattle SuperSonics || 130–117 || Philadelphia Spectrum || 34–5
|- align="center" bgcolor="edbebf"
| 40 || January 23 || @ Milwaukee Bucks || 96–107 || MECCA Arena || 34–6
|- align="center" bgcolor="bbffbb"
| 41 || January 25 || @ Chicago Bulls || 116–99 || Chicago Stadium || 35–6
|- align="center" bgcolor="bbffbb"
| 42 || January 26 || Phoenix Suns || 113–102 || Philadelphia Spectrum || 36–6
|- align="center" bgcolor="bbffbb"
| 43 || January 28 || @ Kansas City Kings || 114–99 || Kemper Arena || 37–6
|- align="center" bgcolor="bbffbb"
| 44 || January 29 || @ Utah Jazz || 126–109 || Salt Palace || 38–6
|-

|- align="center" bgcolor="bbffbb"
| 45 || February 1 || @ Denver Nuggets || 133–124 || McNichols Sports Arena || 39–6
|- align="center" bgcolor="bbffbb"
| 46 || February 3 || @ Golden State Warriors || 117–111 || Oakland–Alameda County Coliseum Arena || 40–6
|- align="center" bgcolor="edbebf"
| 47 || February 4 || @ Portland Trail Blazers || 109–115 || Memorial Coliseum || 40–7
|- align="center" bgcolor="bbffbb"
| 48 || February 6 || @ Seattle SuperSonics || 97–96 || King County Domed Stadium || 41–7
|- align="center" bgcolor="bbffbb"
| 49 || February 9 || Atlanta Hawks || 106–93 || Philadelphia Spectrum || 42–7
|- align="center" bgcolor="bbffbb"
| 50 || February 10 || @ Chicago Bulls || 116–110 || Chicago Stadium || 43–7
|- align="center" bgcolor="bbffbb"
| 51 || February 16 || Denver Nuggets || 116–95 || Philadelphia Spectrum || 44–7
|- align="center" bgcolor="bbffbb"
| 52 || February 18 || Houston Rockets || 127–98 || Philadelphia Spectrum || 45–7
|- align="center" bgcolor="bbffbb"
| 53 || February 20 || New York Knicks || 104–89 || Philadelphia Spectrum || 46–7
|- align="center" bgcolor="bbffbb"
| 54 || February 23 || Dallas Mavericks || 133–101 || Philadelphia Spectrum || 47–7
|- align="center" bgcolor="bbffbb"
| 55 || February 25 || Chicago Bulls || 116–111 || Philadelphia Spectrum || 48–7
|- align="center" bgcolor="bbffbb"
| 56 || February 27 || Golden State Warriors || 115–104 || Philadelphia Spectrum || 49–7
|-

|- align="center" bgcolor="bbffbb"
| 57 || March 1 || @ New York Knicks || 106–94 || Madison Square Garden || 50–7
|- align="center" bgcolor="edbebf"
| 58 || March 4 || @ Boston Celtics || 110–115 || Boston Garden || 50–8
|- align="center" bgcolor="edbebf"
| 59 || March 6 || @ New Jersey Nets || 106–112 || Brendan Byrne Arena || 50–9
|- align="center" bgcolor="bbffbb"
| 60 || March 7 || Detroit Pistons || 123–114 || Philadelphia Spectrum || 51–9
|- align="center" bgcolor="bbffbb"
| 61 || March 12 || @ Washington Bullets || 95–86 || Capital Centre || 52–9
|- align="center" bgcolor="bbffbb"
| 62 || March 13 || Washington Bullets || 97–93 || Philadelphia Spectrum || 53–9
|- align="center" bgcolor="bbffbb"
| 63 || March 15 || @ Indiana Pacers || 132–128 || Market Square Arena || 54–9
|- align="center" bgcolor="bbffbb"
| 64 || March 16 || Boston Celtics || 105–100 || Philadelphia Spectrum || 55–9
|- align="center" bgcolor="bbffbb"
| 65 || March 19 || @ Milwaukee Bucks || 105–97 || MECCA Arena || 56–9
|- align="center" bgcolor="bbffbb"
| 66 || March 20 || @ Detroit Pistons || 121–119 || Pontiac Silverdome || 57–9
|- align="center" bgcolor="edbebf"
| 67 || March 22 || @ New York Knicks || 76–89 || Madison Square Garden || 57–10
|- align="center" bgcolor="bbffbb"
| 68 || March 23 || Milwaukee Bucks || 104–101 || Philadelphia Spectrum || 58–10
|- align="center" bgcolor="edbebf"
| 69 || March 25 || New Jersey Nets || 92–101 || Philadelphia Spectrum || 58–11
|- align="center" bgcolor="bbffbb"
| 70 || March 27 || Cleveland Cavaliers || 94–80 || Philadelphia Spectrum || 59–11
|- align="center" bgcolor="edbebf"
| 71 || March 29 || @ Chicago Bulls || 95–97 || Chicago Stadium || 59–12
|- align="center" bgcolor="bbffbb"
| 72 || March 30 || Atlanta Hawks || 120–113 || Philadelphia Spectrum || 60–12
|-

|- align="center" bgcolor="edbebf"
| 73 || April 1 || New Jersey Nets || 104–111 || Philadelphia Spectrum || 60–13
|- align="center" bgcolor="bbffbb"
| 74 || April 3 || @ Cleveland Cavaliers || 96–84 || Coliseum at Richfield || 61–13
|- align="center" bgcolor="bbffbb"
| 75 || April 5 || @ Milwaukee Bucks || 116–108 || MECCA Arena || 62–13
|- align="center" bgcolor="edbebf"
| 76 || April 6 || San Antonio Spurs || 109–112 || Philadelphia Spectrum || 62–14
|- align="center" bgcolor="bbffbb"
| 77 || April 8 || Indiana Pacers || 126–118 || Philadelphia Spectrum || 63–14
|- align="center" bgcolor="bbffbb"
| 78 || April 10 || New York Knicks || 113–97 || Philadelphia Spectrum || 64–14
|- align="center" bgcolor="edbebf"
| 79 || April 12 || @ Atlanta Hawks || 97–102 || Omni Coliseum || 64–15
|- align="center" bgcolor="edbebf"
| 80 || April 13 || Washington Bullets || 76–95 || Philadelphia Spectrum || 64–16
|- align="center" bgcolor="bbffbb"
| 81 || April 15 || @ New Jersey Nets || 100–98 || Brendan Byrne Arena || 65–16
|- align="center" bgcolor="edbebf"
| 82 || April 17 || @ Boston Celtics || 101–114 || Boston Garden || 65–17
|-

|-
| 1982–83 Schedule

Playoffs

|- align="center" bgcolor="#ccffcc"
| 1
| April 24
| New York
| W 112–102
| Moses Malone (38)
| Moses Malone (17)
| Maurice Cheeks (10)
| Spectrum14,375
| 1–0
|- align="center" bgcolor="#ccffcc"
| 2
| April 27
| New York
| W 98–91
| Moses Malone (30)
| Moses Malone (17)
| Maurice Cheeks (6)
| Spectrum15,829
| 2–0
|- align="center" bgcolor="#ccffcc"
| 3
| April 30
| @ New York
| W 107–105
| Moses Malone (28)
| Moses Malone (14)
| Maurice Cheeks (7)
| Madison Square Garden17,735
| 3–0
|- align="center" bgcolor="#ccffcc"
| 4
| May 1
| @ New York
| W 105–102
| Moses Malone (29)
| Moses Malone (14)
| Maurice Cheeks (7)
| Madison Square Garden15,457
| 4–0
|-

|- align="center" bgcolor="#ccffcc"
| 1
| May 8
| Milwaukee
| W 111–109 (OT)
| Maurice Cheeks (26)
| Moses Malone (12)
| Maurice Cheeks (7)
| Spectrum18,482
| 1–0
|- align="center" bgcolor="#ccffcc"
| 2
| May 11
| Milwaukee
| W 87–81
| Moses Malone (26)
| Moses Malone (17)
| Cheeks, Toney (4)
| Spectrum18,482
| 2–0
|- align="center" bgcolor="#ccffcc"
| 3
| May 14
| @ Milwaukee
| W 104–96
| Julius Erving (26)
| Moses Malone (14)
| Maurice Cheeks (9)
| MECCA Arena11,052
| 3–0
|- align="center" bgcolor="#ffcccc"
| 4
| May 15
| @ Milwaukee
| L 94–100
| Andrew Toney (24)
| Moses Malone (12)
| Maurice Cheeks (8)
| MECCA Arena11,052
| 3–1
|- align="center" bgcolor="#ccffcc"
| 5
| May 18
| Milwaukee
| W 115–103
| Andrew Toney (30)
| Moses Malone (17)
| Maurice Cheeks (8)
| Spectrum18,482
| 4–1
|-
|-

|- align="center" bgcolor="#ccffcc"
| 1
| May 22
| Los Angeles
| W 113–107
| Moses Malone (27)
| Moses Malone (18)
| Julius Erving (9)
| Spectrum18,482
| 1–0
|- align="center" bgcolor="#ccffcc"
| 2
| May 26
| Los Angeles
| W 103–93
| Moses Malone (24)
| Moses Malone (12)
| Maurice Cheeks (8)
| Spectrum18,482
| 2–0
|- align="center" bgcolor="#ccffcc"
| 3
| May 29
| @ Los Angeles
| W 111–94
| Moses Malone (28)
| Moses Malone (19)
| Moses Malone (6)
| The Forum17,505
| 3–0
|- align="center" bgcolor="#ccffcc"
| 4
| May 31
| @ Los Angeles
| W 115–108
| Moses Malone (24)
| Moses Malone (23)
| Andrew Toney (9)
| The Forum17,505
| 4–0
|-

NBA Finals
The 1983 NBA Finals was the championship round of the  season.

The 76ers went on to capture their second NBA championship in Philadelphia, and the third as the 76ers/Nationals franchise as they swept the New York Knicks, and proceeded to beat the Milwaukee Bucks in five games. They finally finished it off with a four-game sweep of the Los Angeles Lakers, who had defeated them the season before, making this the only NBA championship not to be won by either the Lakers or the Boston Celtics from 1980 to 1988.

Said head coach Billy Cunningham, "The difference from last year was Moses." Malone was named MVP of the 1983 Finals, as well as league MVP for the third time in his career. The 76ers completed one of the most dominating playoff runs in league history with a 12-1 mark after league and NBA Finals MVP Moses promised "Fo', fo', fo" (as in "four, four, four" – four wins to win each playoff series). The 76ers were also led by Julius Erving, Maurice Cheeks, Andrew Toney, and Bobby Jones.

The 1983 NBA Finals was the last to end before June 1. This championship is especially noted because it would be the last major sports championship for the city of Philadelphia until the Phillies won the 2008 World Series. At the time, no other city with all four professional sports teams had a championship drought last as long as that from 1983 to 2008 (25 years). When the Flyers played for the 2010 Stanley Cup, The Ottawa Citizen reported that the main reason for that lengthy championship drought was because the only years the city's teams played for championships during that time were years presidents were inaugurated.

Following the 1983 NBA Finals, a video documentary called "That Championship Feeling" recaps the NBA Playoff action that year. Dick Stockton narrated the video, and Irene Cara's 1983 hit single "What A Feeling" is the official theme song for the video documentary. For the first time, NBA Entertainment used videotape instead of film for all the on-court and off-court footage.

Awards, records, and legacy
Moses Malone, NBA Most Valuable Player Award
Moses Malone, NBA Finals Most Valuable Player Award
Bobby Jones, NBA Sixth Man of the Year Award
Moses Malone, All-NBA First Team
Julius Erving, All-NBA First Team
Bobby Jones, NBA All-Defensive First Team
Maurice Cheeks, NBA All-Defensive First Team
Moses Malone, NBA All-Defensive First Team

At the time, their 65-17 regular season record ranked as the fifth greatest regular season win total in NBA history. Previously, only the 1972 Lakers (69-13), 1967 Sixers (68-13), 1971 Bucks (66-16), and 1973 Celtics (68-14; who lost the Conference Finals) exceeded this win total.

In addition, their regular season winning percentage of .793 was only bettered by three teams before 1968 (the 1947 Washington Capitals of .817; 1950 Syracuse Nations of .797 and aforementioned 1967 Sixers of .840), when NBA teams played less than an 82-game regular season. Both the Capitols and the Nationals failed to win an NBA championship.

Their .8105 winning percentage, combined regular season and postseason (77-18) in 1983, has been topped since by just five teams, the 1986 Celtics (.820, also with 18 losses), 1996 and 97 Bulls (.870 and .832), 2016 Warriors (.830, with 18 losses as well as an NBA Finals loss), and 2017 Warriors (.838).

Through the first 66 regular season games, their record stood at 57–9. The 2016 Golden State Warriors started only 3 games better at 60-6 before breaking the regular season record with 73 wins.

Possessing an exceptionally talented roster and a brilliant coaching staff with Billy Cunningham, Matt Goukas, and Jack McMahon, the 1983 Philadelphia 76ers were one of the very best teams in NBA history.

References

 Philadelphia 76ers on Basketball Reference

Philadelphia
Philadelphia 76ers seasons
Eastern Conference (NBA) championship seasons
NBA championship seasons
Philadelphia
Philadelphia